The Agricultural & Applied Economics Association (AAEA) is a not-for-profit professional association for those interested in the field of agricultural and applied economics. The AAEA association has an annual meeting every year.

It publishes two journals, the American Journal of Agricultural Economics (AJAE), and the Applied Economic Perspectives and Policy (AEPP) both of which are published by Wiley.

References

External links
AAEA Home Page
 

Economics societies
Business and finance professional associations
Agricultural economics